Staccato is a form of musical articulation, signifying an unconnected note.

Staccato may also refer to:

Johnny Staccato, an American private detective series and its title character
The Five Man Electrical Band, a Canadian rock group formerly known as The Staccatos
Staccato, a comic by Shawn Handyside
Staccato lightning, a form of lightning
Staccato cough, a type of cough
Mr. Staccato, a character in The Secret Order of the Gumm Street Girls